Jeonju Citizen FC is a South Korean football club based in the city of Jeonju. It is currently a member of the K4 League, the fourth tier of league football in South Korea.

Season-by-season records

Key
W = Winner
RU = Runners-up
SF = Semi-Final
QF = Quarter-final
Ro16 = Round of 16
Ro32 = Round of 32
GS = Group Stage

External links
 Official website

K4 League clubs
K3 League (2007–2019) clubs
Sport in Jeonju
2007 establishments in South Korea
Association football clubs established in 2007